The Annie Award for Best Animated Home Entertainment Production is awarded annually by ASIFA-Hollywood, a non-profit organization that honors contributions to animation, to the best animated direct-to-video film of the year. It is one of the Annie Awards, which honor contributions to animation, including producers, directors, and voice actors. The Annie Awards were created in 1972 by June Foray to honor individual lifetime contributions to animation.

History
In 1992, the scope of the awards was expanded to honor animation as a whole; the Annie Award for Best Animated Feature was created as a result of this move, and subsequent awards have been created to recognize different contributions to animation. The Annie Award for Best Animated Home Entertainment Production was created in 1995, and has been awarded yearly since. It was originally known as the Annie Award for Best Animated Video Production; the name of the award was changed in 1997 to the Annie Award for Best Home Video Production, was changed again in 1998 to the Annie Award for Outstanding Achievement in an Animated Home Video Production,  and was changed in 2002 to the current name. To be eligible for the award, the film must have been released in the year before the next Annie Awards ceremony, and the developers of the game must send a five-minute sample DVD of the film to a committee appointed by the Board of Directors of ASIFA-Hollywood.

As of 2008, the Annie Award for Best Animated Home Entertainment Production has been awarded to thirteen direct-to-video films. The Gate to the Mind’s Eye, a film in the Mind's Eye series, was the first film to win the award. Macross Plus, an original video animation, was the first film to feature Japanese anime to be nominated for the award; the only other film featuring anime to be nominated is the Wachowskis' The Animatrix, a series of animated videos set in the fictional universe of The Matrix series. The film production company Walt Disney Television Animation has had nine of its films nominated for the award, more than any other company, and DisneyToon Studios, a division of Walt Disney Television Animation, has had eight of its films nominated for the award.

Winners and nominees

1990s

2000s

References

External links
 Official website of the Annie Awards

Annie Awards